Royal Hall may refer to:

Royal Albert Hall
Royal Hall, Harrogate
Royal Festival Hall, London
Nottingham Royal Concert Hall, part of the Royal Centre in Nottingham

See also
 Royal Concert Hall (disambiguation)

Architectural disambiguation pages